Nicholas Bussmann is a composer and performer.

He is a founder of the Love Song Competition which takes place every year in Berlin. Nicholas Bussmann has collaborated with Toshimaru Nakamura (Alles 3) and Martin Brandlmayr (Kapital band 1) amongst others.

References

External links
http://www.studiobeige.de
http://www.kapitalband1.com

German composers
Living people
Year of birth missing (living people)